Sizwe Eric Mdlinzo (born 11 March 1992) is a South African professional soccer player who plays as a midfielder for South African Premier Division side Marumo Gallants.

References

1992 births
Living people
South African soccer players
People from eThekwini Metropolitan Municipality
Soccer players from KwaZulu-Natal
Association football defenders
Cape Town All Stars players
Chippa United F.C. players
TS Galaxy F.C. players
Marumo Gallants F.C. players
South African Premier Division players
National First Division players